The Sixteenth Century Journal: The Journal of Early Modern Studies (SCJ) is a quarterly journal of early modern studies. The senior editors are Merry Wiesner-Hanks and Patricia Phillippy. It is published by Sixteenth Century Publisher Inc. and affiliated with the Sixteenth Century Society and Conference.

SCJ was founded in 1969, and has been at Truman State University since 1971. It was initially a biannual journal and moved to quarterly publication in 1976.

References

External links

History journals
Publications established in 1969
Quarterly journals
Truman State University
Academic journals published by university presses of the United States